Li Ting and Sun Tiantian were the defending champions, but decided not to defend their title together.

Li played alongside Li Na, whereas Sun played alongside Hao Jie.

Li & Li withdrew in the quarterfinals, and Hao & Sun lost in the first round to Julia Vorobieva & Yuan Meng.

Maria Elena Camerin and Emmanuelle Gagliardi, having enjoyed a walkover for both the quarterfinals and the semifinals, then won the final, defeating Neha Uberoi and Shikha Uberoi, 7–6(7–5), 6–3.

Seeds

Draw

References
http://www.itftennis.com/womens/tournaments/tournamentresults.asp?event=1100073059&tournament=1100012718

Guangzhou International Women's Open
2005 WTA Tour